Bestie (stylized as BESTie) was a South Korean girl group formed by YNB Entertainment. They released their debut single, "Pitapat", in July 2013. The group was composed of four members, Hyeyeon, Uji, Dahye and Haeryung. While Uji and Dahye parted their ways with YNB Entertainment in September 2017, the group disbanded in 2018 following the news of Hyeyeon joining Star Entertainment.

History

2013: Debut and digital singles
Hyeyeon, Uji, and Haeryung were previously in another girl group, EXID, before taking their leave for personal reasons, as the former two left to complete their studies, while the latter also left to focus on her acting career. With the addition of Dahye, they debuted as a group on July 11, 2013, with the release of their first single "Pitapat" and its music video, starring Jo Kwon and Yoo Se-yoon. The group held their debut live performance on KBS Music Bank on July 12.

On October 16, they released their second single album with the title track "Love Options". Their first performance was on M! Countdown. In December, Hyeyeon featured on Quattro Code's single "Stick With You" and Bestie released the digital single "Zzang Christmas".

2014–2015: Hot Baby and Love Emotion
On February 28, 2014, they released "Thank U Very Much" as a digital released with an accompanying music video. On June 27, they performed a cover of Girls' Generation's "Mr.Mr." with AOA member's Jimin, Choa, Chanmi and Hyejeong, and Girl's Day, on Music Bank. On July 11, Bestie released their fifth digital single "Like A Star" in celebration of their one-year anniversary. "Like A Star", as well as their previous singles "Pitapat" and "Thank U Very Much", were featured on their first EP Hot Baby, released on July 28. The music video for the EP's title track "Hot Baby" was released three days later. The EP charted at #7, and on August 29, Bestie released a repackaged version titled I Need You. The repackage featured the new single "I Need You", produced by Duble Sidekick and HomeBoy. In September, Hyeyeon featured on Yoo Seung-woo's single "Lovers' Song", and on December 19, Bestie covered Super Junior's "Mamacita" on Music Bank as a year-end performance.

The group's second EP Love Emotion was released on May 8, 2015, and charted at #8. The music video for its lead single "Excuse Me" was ranked fourth on Billboard's list of "Most Viewed K-Pop Videos in America" and sixth on its list of "Most Viewed K-Pop Videos around the World" for the month of May. On August 29, Bestie performed at New Delhi's Sirifort Auditorium as part of the 2015 Feel Korea in New Delhi tour. That year, the group won the Next Generation Award at the Golden Disk Awards. They also collaborated with other artists, with Uji collaborating with The Channels on the single "Love Letter" and Chad Future's "So Good", Dahye featuring on Yoo Se-yoon's "We Fought", and Hyeyeon featuring on Just Cricket's "Perfect Chemistry".

2016–2018: Forthcoming comeback, members departure and disbandment
In January 2016 it has been reported that Dahye fell from the stairs, fracturing her ankle and right arm, and needed time to recover; YNB Entertainment stated that Bestie's comeback has been pushed to give Dahye time to get better. It was announced that Bestie would be coming back in May with a new album with a possibly release date, which ultimately never happened. 
In summer 2016 Uji participated in JTBC reality singing competition Girl Spirit, where she finished in the third place.
The group's last performance was on December 16, 2016 at Military Year End Concert.

On September 5, 2017, YNB Entertainment announced that Uji and Dahye would be leaving Bestie while Hyeyeon and Haeryung would be continuing as a group, with the possibility that new members would be added. That month, it was also confirmed that Hyeyeon would be appearing on the idol competition program The Unit. She was eliminated from the show in episode 13 with her final rank being 27.

After it was no longer possible to access YNB Ent. official website, rumours about the company's bankruptcy started circulating online. 
In September 2018 Star Entertainment opened official Instagram account, as well as fancafe, for their new artist Kang Hyeyeon, which concluded the fans' suspicions about the group's disbandment without any official statements from YNB Entertainment.

Members

Former members
 Hyeyeon (혜연)
 Uji (유지)
 Dahye (다혜)
 Haeryung (해령)

Discography

Extended plays

Singles

Collaborations

Music videos

Awards and nominations

References

External links

 Bestie at YNB Entertainment 

K-pop music groups
Musical groups established in 2013
Musical groups disestablished in 2018
South Korean girl groups
South Korean dance music groups
Musical quartets
2013 establishments in South Korea